Boaz Island, formerly known as Gate's Island or Yates Island, is one of the six main islands of Bermuda. It is part of a chain of islands in the west of the country that make up Sandys Parish, lying between the larger Ireland Island and Watford Island, with which it has been joined by a man-made isthmus. South of Watford Island is Somerset Island. Boaz and Watford are connected to Somerset by Watford Bridge, and to Ireland by Gray's Bridge. Watford's east coast forms part of the edge of the Great Sound. The western end of the channel between Boaz and Watford was blocked by the isthmus, creating a camber that opens to the Great Sound. Boaz and Watford Islands were parts of the Royal Naval base, which included the HM Dockyard on Ireland Island.

The Clarence Barracks were built on Boaz in the middle of the 19th century to house convict labourers who had formerly been accommodated aboard Prison hulks. A hospital and other connected facilities were built on neighboring Watford Island. When the Convict Establishment was withdrawn in the 1860s, both islands were transferred to the British Army, and the bridge between was replaced with the man-made isthmus.

With the reduction of the Bermuda Garrison after the First World War, both islands were returned to the Royal Navy in the 1930s. From 1939, Boaz Island and Watford Island were used as Royal Naval Air Station Bermuda (which had previously been located in the North Yard on Ireland Island). The primary role of the air station was the servicing, repair and replacement of spotter floatplanes and flying boats belonging to naval vessels. Early in the Second World War, with no other units to fill the role, aeroplanes from Boaz Island were used to maintain anti-submarine air patrols, using whatever aircrew were on hand, including pilots from the Bermuda Flying School on Darrell's Island. Subsequently, target tugs were based at the air station to service the Allied naval vessels working-up on Bermuda's waters.

The air station was placed on a care and maintenance footing after the war and both islands were among the former Admiralty and War Office lands transferred to the local government in the 1950s. All that remains of the Fleet Air Arm facility today is a hangar on runway road, and two slips.

References

Islands of Bermuda
Sandys Parish
Installations of the British Army
Royal Navy shore establishments
World War I sites in Bermuda
World War II sites in Bermuda